The  Miss Massachusetts USA competition is the pageant that selects the representative for the state of Massachusetts in the Miss USA pageant. It is currently produced by The Clemente Organization based in Malden, Massachusetts, which also produces the Maine pageant.

Shawnae Jebbia was crowned Miss USA in 1998 and Susie Castillo won the crown in 2003. Both Miss USA winners from Massachusetts were asked the same final question during the live telecasts. The most recent placement was Allissa Latham in 2018, placing Top 15.

Annika Sharma of Newton was crowned Miss Massachusetts USA 2023 on January 29, 2023. She will represent Massachusetts at Miss USA 2023.

Gallery of titleholders

Results summary
Miss USAs: Shawnae Jebbia (1998), Susie Castillo (2003)
1st runners-up: Diane Pollard (1978)                                                                                                                                                         
Top 10/12: Monica Magnus (1979), Janet Marie Flaherty (1982), Mercedes Waggoner (1985), Kristen Mastroianni (1995), Jacqueline Bruno (2008)
Top 15: Sandra Ramsey (1957), Barbara Feldman (1960), Elaine Cusick (1961), Sandra Smith (1963), Nancy Brackett (1966), Sarah Kidd (2013), Allissa Latham (2018)
Massachusetts holds a record of 15 placements at Miss USA.

Awards
Miss Congeniality: Stacey Blaine (1993)
Best State Costume: JoAnne Savery (1981)

Winners 

Color key

1 Age at the time of the Miss USA pageant

References

External links
Official Website

Massachusetts
Massachusetts culture
Women in Massachusetts
Recurring events established in 1952
1952 establishments in Massachusetts
Annual events in Massachusetts